Events from the year 1942 in Denmark.

Incumbents
 Monarch – Christian X
 Prime minister – Thorvald Stauning (until 4 May), Vilhelm Buhl (until 9 November), Erik Scavenius

Events

 4 May – Vilhelm Buhl is appointed to new prime minister of Denmark following Thorvald Stauning's death the previous day.
 11 September – Sabotage results in a fire at the German Reichdeutsche Schulen in Emdrup, Copenhagen.
 26 September – Sabotage against Adler Auto Service at Lyngbyvej 26 in Copenhagen.
 19 October – Christian X is severely injured when he falls off his horse at Esplanaden on his morning ride.
 28 October – Beginning of the Telegram Crisis.
 5 November – Werner Best is appointed the Third Reich's Plenipotentiary (Reichsbevollmächtigter) in Denmark.
 27 November – The Danish Outdoor Council is founded

Sports
 B 93 wins their 8th Danish football championship by winning their 1941–42 Danish War Tournament.

Births

 18 February – Kirsten Jacobsen, politician (died 2010)
 13 April – Poul Anker Bech, painter (died 2009)
 15 June – Birgitte Alsted, violinist, teacher and composer
 27 August – Per Stig Møller, politician, writer
 12 September – Jytte Hilden, chemical engineer and politician.
29 October – Vita Andersen, poet, novelist, playwright and children's writer (died 2021).

Deaths
 10 January – Alba Schwartz, author and novelist (born 1857)
 20 March – Aksel Agerby, composer, organist, and music administrator (born 1889)
 2 April – Peter Esben-Petersen, entomologist (born 1869)
 3 May – Thorvald Stauning, politician, Prime Minister of Denmark (born 1873)
 30 May – August Hassel, sculptor (born 1864)
 23 July – Valdemar Poulsen, engineer who developed a magnetic wire recorder (born 1869)
 24 November – Carl Christensen, botanist (born 1872)
 12 December – Benedict Nordentoft, educator and cleric, co-founder of a Danish community with a Lutheran church and a folk high school in Solvang, California (born 1873)

References

 
Denmark
Years of the 20th century in Denmark
1940s in Denmark
1942 in Europe